Cadenhead is a surname. Notable people with the surname include:

James Cadenhead (1858–1927), Scottish landscape and portrait painter
Rogers Cadenhead (born 1967), American computer book author and web publisher